Club Deportivo Móstoles  was a Spanish football team from Móstoles, a city in the southern metropolitan area of Madrid. Founded in 1955 and dissolved in 2012 it played its last season in Tercera División, holding home matches at Estadio El Soto, which sat about 14,000 spectators.

Team colours were all-blue, with white socks.

History
The club was founded on September 23, 1955 with José Alejandro Arenas Molina as its first president. Móstoles made its first appearance in the country's third division in 1990–91, 35 years after its formation. It only lasted one season, however, and went on to amass a further four presences in that category in the following two decades, never lasting more than two seasons.

The club suffered relegation from the fourth level at the end of the 2011–12 campaign, thus returning to the regional championships. It folded shortly after, due to an overall debt of €234,591 owed to its players from 2011–12 and previous seasons. Every player from the 2011-12 season sued the club for wages unpaid. The players won the lawsuit.

Season to season

6 seasons in Segunda División B
23 seasons in Tercera División

Notable former players
 Gustavo di Lella
  Dani Evuy
 Harvey Esajas
 Rubén de la Red
 Jaime Mata

References

External links
Official website 
Futbolme team profile 

Defunct football clubs in the Community of Madrid
Association football clubs established in 1955
Association football clubs disestablished in 2012
Sport in Móstoles
1955 establishments in Spain
2012 disestablishments in Spain